Highway 199 (AR 199, Ark. 199, and Hwy. 199) is a north–south state highway in Southeast Arkansas. The route begins at US Highway 425 (US 425) at Terry and runs north  to US 65 at Linwood. The route is maintained by the Arkansas Department of Transportation (ArDOT).

Route description
Highway 199 begins at US 425 in Southeast Arkansas in the Lower Arkansas Delta near Terry. The area is known for flat, agricultural land with swamps, bayous and small towns dotting the landscape. The route crosses three bayous and passes through the unincorporated community of Moscow before intersecting US 65, where it terminates.

History
The route was designated by the Arkansas State Highway Commission on June 23, 1965. It has not been changed or realigned since creation.

Major intersections

See also

Notes

References

External links

199
Transportation in Lincoln County, Arkansas
Transportation in Jefferson County, Arkansas